Hryhorenko is a Ukrainian surname derived from the given name "Hryhor", or Gregory. The Russified form is Grigorenko.
Notable people with the surname include:

Hrytsko Hryhorenko (1867-1924), pen name of Oleksandra Sudovshchykova-Kosach,  Ukrainian journalist and writer
Kateryna Hryhorenko (born 1985),  Ukrainian cross country skier
Petro Hryhorenko (1907-1987),  Soviet Army general of Ukrainian descent, who became a dissident and a writer

See also

Ukrainian-language surnames
Patronymic surnames
Surnames from given names